Highway 715 is a highway in the Canadian province of Saskatchewan. It runs from Highway 36 near Galilee to Highway 339 near Claybank.

Highway 715 also passes near Spring Valley and Bayard. It connects with Highway 624 near Spring Valley.

See also 
Roads in Saskatchewan
Transportation in Saskatchewan

References 

715